Seongnam Ilhwa Chunma–Suwon Samsung Bluewings football rivalry was called Magyedaejeon or Magye derby. K League stated in its official website that this match is one of classic football rivalries in the league.
The match takes place between the two professional K League Classic teams in Seoul National Capital Area; Seongnam Ilhwa Chunma and Suwon Samsung Bluewings.

History 
The rivalry started in 1996 and became more intense when Cheonan Ilhwa Chunma moved to Seongnam and became Seongnam Ilhwa Chunma. As both clubs were enjoying success at the time, matches between those two were both fierce and tough. In addition, the fact that Seongnam and Suwon are less than 30 km away added intensity to the matches.

The rivalry became prominent in the mid-2000s after the name Magyedaejeon was dubbed to the game. The name "Magyedaejeon" derived from a graphic novel with the same title by a renowned Korean cartoonist Kim Sung-Mo. Some fans came up with the idea to use the name for the match between Seongnam and Suwon because Magyedaejeon, which can be translated into the "Battle between Horse and Rooster," can be viewed an interesting symbolization of the game. Seongnam's mascot Chunma, which is Korean Pegasus, represents "Ma", which is horse, while "Gye", rooster, perfectly matches Suwon's name, "Bluewings."
The name became popular after Schadarappa, a popular Korean football cartoonist famous for being a fervent Seongnam fan, frequently used the term in his cartoons.

Because both clubs have remained successful in Korea, Magyedaejeon was played in several important occasions such as 2000 Korean Super Cup Final, 2000 Adidas Cup Final, 2006 K-League Championship Final, 2009 Korean FA Cup Final, 2010 AFC Champions League Quarter-final and 2011 Korean FA Cup Final.

Players who have played for both clubs 
  Kim Yi-Joo (Seongnam: 1989-1995, Suwon: 1996-1997, Seongnam: 1997-1998)
  Park Nam-Yeol (Seongnam: 1993-2003, Suwon: 2004)
  Park Choong-Kyun (Suwon: 1996-2001, Seongnam: 2001-2003)
  Lee Ki-Hyung (Suwon: 1996-2002, Seongnam: 2003-2004)
  Denis (Lee Seong-Nam) (Suwon: 1996-2002, Seongnam: 2003-2005, Suwon: 2006-2007)
  Saša (Suwon: 1998-2000, Seongnam: 2001-2003)
  Hwang In-Soo (Seongnam: 2000-2001, Suwon: 2001-2002)
  Kim Dae-Eui (Seongnam: 2000-2003, Suwon: 2004-2010)
  Seo Dong-Won (Suwon: 2001, Seongnam: 2006-2007)
  Kim Do-Heon (Suwon: 2001-2005, Seongnam: 2005-2007, Suwon: 2009-2010, 2012–present)
  Son Dae-Ho (Suwon: 2002-2004, Seongnam: 2005-2008)
  Cho Byung-Kuk (Suwon: 2002-2004, Seongnam: 2005-2010)
  Savik (Lee Sa-Vik) (Seongnam: 2003-2005, Suwon: 2005-2007)
  Namgung Woong (Suwon: 2003-2010, Seongnam: 2011-2012)
  Kim Dong-Hyun (Suwon: 2004-2005, Seongnam: 2007-2008)
  Ahn Hyo-Yeon (Suwon: 2005, Seongnam: 2006, Suwon: 2007-2008)
  Kim Sang-Duk (Suwon: 2005, Seongnam: 2006-2007)
  Itamar (Suwon: 2005-2006, Seongnam: 2007)
  Han Dong-Won (Seongnam: 2007-2009, Suwon: 2012)
  Choi Sung-Kuk (Seongnam: 2007-2010, Suwon: 2011)
  Jung Sung-Ryong (Seongnam: 2008-2010, Suwon: 2011–present)
  Cho Dong-Gun (Seongnam: 2008-2011, Suwon: 2012–present)
  Radončić (Seongnam: 2009-2011, Suwon: 2012–present)
  Lee Sang-Ki (Seongnam: 2010, Suwon: 2011, 2013–present)
  Ha Kang-Jin (Suwon: 2010, Seongnam: 2011-2012)
  Hwang Jae-Won (Suwon: 2010-2011, Seongnam: 2012–present)
  Hong Chul (Seongnam: 2010-2012, Suwon: 2013–present)
  Chung Da-Woon (Seongnam: 2012, Suwon: 2013)

Venues

Match reports

League matches 
 Chunan Ilhwa Chunma vs Suwon Samsung Bluewings (1996-1999)

League Cup matches 
 Chunan Ilhwa Chunma vs Suwon Samsung Bluewings (1996-1999)

FA Cup matches 
 Chunan Ilhwa Chunma vs Suwon Samsung Bluewings (1996-1999)

Super Cup matches

AFC Champions League matches

Records & Statistics

All-time results 
 K League official match statistics are including Chunan Ilhwa Chunma statistics.
 Penalty shoot-outs results are counted as a drawn match.

Honours

See also 
 List of association football rivalries
 List of sports rivalries
 Nationalism and sport

References

External links 

Seongnam FC
Suwon Samsung Bluewings
Football rivalries in South Korea